Kōhei Hasebe may refer to:

 Kōhei Hasebe (baseball)
 Kōhei Hasebe (shogi)